Henry Jacobs  (1924–2015) was an American humorist.

Henry Jacobs may also refer to:

 Henry Jacobs (priest) (1824–1901), first Dean of Christchurch, NZ
 Henry Eyster Jacobs (1844–1932), American religious figure and writer
Henry P. Jacobs, American Baptist preacher, schools founder, and state legislator
Henry Barton Jacobs, American physician and educator

See also
 Harry Jacobs (disambiguation)
 Henry Jacob (1563–1624), English dissenter